Fellowes Brands is a manufacturer of office and technology accessories. Fellowes Brands owns and operates 17 subsidiaries worldwide in Canada, United Kingdom, France, Germany, Italy, The Netherlands, Poland, Mexico, Spain, Russia, Australia, China, Singapore, Malaysia, Japan, South Korea, and South Africa and employs more than 1,500 people throughout the world.

The company was founded in Chicago, Illinois, in 1917 by Harry Fellowes as the Bankers Box Company, producing the Bankers Box line of record storage boxes. Sons Folger and John Fellowes joined the business in 1934 and 1938, respectively, and grandson James Fellowes joined in 1969 and was named president in 1983. The same year the company name was changed from Bankers Box to Fellowes to reflect an expansion into business machines and computer accessory products.  James Fellowes would later become CEO in 1997. As the brand portfolio expanded, the company was named Fellowes Brands in 2015.

The great-grandson of the founder and the fourth generation of the Fellowes family, John Fellowes, is currently CEO of Fellowes Brands. The company's corporate headquarters are in Itasca, Illinois. In November 2013, Fellowes Aeramax line of air purifiers achieved Asthma and Allergy Friendly Certification.

References

External links
 
 Fellowes Brands History [Company History]
 OPI article: https://www.opi.net/issues/2017/february-2017/features-february-2017/vendor-profile-celebrating-100-years-of-fellowes/
 PC Mag Review: https://www.pcmag.com/article2/0,2817,2456371,00.asp

Companies based in DuPage County, Illinois
1917 establishments in Illinois
Manufacturing companies based in Illinois
American companies established in 1917